John Patrick Thornton (born June 15, 1984) is an American business executive. He is CEO of Astrobotic Technology Inc. which develops technology for lunar and planetary exploration.

Career
Following graduation from Carnegie Mellon University, John was recruited to Astrobotic Technology Inc. by founder Red Whittaker and was promoted to CEO soon after. Under John's tenure Astrobotic Technology Inc secured several contracts from NASA including a $79.5 million contract to deliver payloads to the moon.

In 2019, he was named CEO of the Year by the Pittsburgh Tech Council.

Personal life
John grew up in Califon, New Jersey where he was a boy scout earning the rank of Eagle Scout and attended Voorhees High School where he was on the varsity fencing squad. In 2015, John married Justine Kasznica Thornton. They live in Pittsburgh, Pennsylvania.

References

1984 births
Living people
Businesspeople from New Jersey
People from Califon, New Jersey
Businesspeople from Pittsburgh
Voorhees High School alumni